Roman Yuryevich Maikin (born 14 August 1990) is a Russian racing cyclist, who currently rides for Russian amateur team Marathon–Tula. He rode at the 2014 UCI Road World Championships.

Major results

2012
 6th Schaal Sels
 7th Grote Prijs Stad Zottegem
2014
 3rd Giro di Toscana
 4th Mayor Cup
 7th Overall Grand Prix of Sochi
1st  Points classification
1st Stage 2
2015
 Tour of Kuban
1st  Points classification
1st Stage 3
 2nd Krasnodar–Anapa
 2nd Grand Prix Minsk
 2nd Coupe des Carpathes
 3rd Maykop–Ulyap–Maykop
 3rd Memoriał Henryka Łasaka
 3rd Arnhem–Veenendaal Classic
 5th Grand Prix of Moscow
 5th Circuito de Getxo
 8th Moscow Cup
 9th Gran Premio Industria e Commercio di Prato 
2016
 1st Stage 2 Tour du Limousin
 2nd Overall Tour of Estonia
1st Stage 2
 3rd Grote Prijs Jef Scherens
 3rd Tour of Almaty
 8th Clásica de Almería
 9th Ronde van Limburg
 9th Coppa Bernocchi
 10th Gran Premio di Lugano
 10th Coppa Sabatini
2017
 4th Gran Premio della Costa Etruschi
2018
 2nd Overall Belgrade–Banja Luka
 10th Classic Loire-Atlantique
2019
 4th Overall Tour of Xingtai
 6th Overall Five Rings of Moscow
2020
 1st Stage 1 Tour de Serbie
2021
 2nd Overall Five Rings of Moscow

References

External links

1990 births
Living people
Russian male cyclists
Place of birth missing (living people)